Bowen Secondary School (BWSS) is a government school at Lorong Napiri, off Yio Chu Kang road in Hougang, Singapore.

History 
Bowen Secondary School started in 1982 in the town of Ang Mo Kio.

On 4 December 1999, Bowen moved to new premises along Lorong Napiri off Yio Chu Kang Road. In 2000, the school became a single session school with 1374 pupils.

Principals 
Since its establishment, the school has had a total of seven principals and twelve vice-principals.

Identity and culture

Uniform and attire 
Bowen Secondary School's formal uniform consists of a grey shirt with skirts for female students, shorts for male students in lower secondary levels, or long pants for boys in upper secondary levels. The shirt features a chest pocket. A blue tie is worn on Mondays and during inportant school activities. A red school tie is worn by Student Councillors. A smart casual attire can be worn on Tuesdays to fridays, consisting of a blue polo shirt. The Bowen P.E. Attire consists of a dark blue shirt with light blue lining, together with black shorts.

Campus 
Bowen Secondary School's campus has a dome-shaped entrance, and a green roof design. There is a second entrance with a roof consisting of long, narrow panels that are oriented from the gutter to the ridge. This roofing system is used for steep-sloped and low-sloped roofs, and is designed as a triangular roofed window. The school has a soccer field, a cafeteria, a garden, three sports hall, a library, two carparks and an arcade.

Academic information 
Being a government secondary school, Bowen Secondary School offers three academic streams, namely the four-year Express course, as well as the Normal Course, comprising Normal (Academic) and Normal (Technical) academic streams.

GCE O Level Express Course 
The Express Course is a nationwide four-year programme that leads up to the Singapore-Cambridge GCE Ordinary Level examination.

Academic subjects 
The examinable academic subjects for Singapore-Cambridge GCE Ordinary Level offered by Bowen Secondary School for upper secondary level (via. streaming in secondary 2 level), as of 2017, are listed below.

Notes:
 Subjects indicated with ' * ' are mandatory subjects.
 All students in Singapore are required to undertake a Mother Tongue Language as an examinable subject, as indicated by ' ^ '.
 "SPA" in Pure Science subjects refers to the incorporation of School-based Science Practical Assessment, which 20% of the subject result in the national examination are determined by school-based practical examinations, supervised by the Singapore Examinations and Assessment Board. The SPA Assessment has been replaced by one Practical Assessment in the 2018 O Levels.

Subject-Based Banding 
The school also offers Subject Based Banding. Bowen Secondary is one of the 28 secondary schools selected by MOE to start piloting aspects of Full Subject-Based Banding (Full SBB) from 2020 onwards.

Normal Course 
The Normal Course is a nationwide four-year programme leading to the Singapore-Cambridge GCE Normal Level examination, which runs either the Normal (Academic) curriculum or Normal (Technical) curriculum, abbreviated as N(A) and N(T) respectively.

Normal (Academic) Course 
In the Normal (Academic) course, students offer 5–8 subjects in the Singapore-Cambridge GCE Normal Level examination. Compulsory subjects include:

 English Language
 Mother Tongue Language
 Mathematics
 Combined Humanities

A 5th year leading to the Singapore-Cambridge GCE Ordinary Level examination is available to N(A) students who perform well in their Singapore-Cambridge GCE Normal Level examination. Students can move from one course to another based on their performance and the assessment of the school principal and teachers.

Normal (Technical) Course 
The Normal (Technical) course prepares students for a technical-vocational education at the Institute of Technical Education. Students will offer 5–7 subjects in the Singapore-Cambridge GCE Normal Level examination. The curriculum is tailored towards strengthening students' proficiency in English and mathematics. Students take English Language, Mathematics, Basic Mother Tongue and Computer Applications as compulsory subjects.

Notable alumni 
 Michelle Chia: television presenter and actress, Mediacorp

References

External links 
 Home page
 Bowen Secondary School Taekwondo Club e

Secondary schools in Singapore
Educational institutions established in 1982
Schools in Hougang
1982 establishments in Singapore